Athrips nigricostella is a moth of the family Gelechiidae. It is found in France, Germany, Poland, Austria, Switzerland, Italy, the Czech Republic, Slovakia, Slovenia, Hungary, Romania, Ukraine and Russia. It is also found in Turkey, Kazakhstan, Kyrgyzstan, the Russian Far East, China (Xinjiang) and Japan.

The larvae feed on Medicago sativa and Medicago minima. They spin together the terminal leaves of their host plant. Pupation takes place in a white cocoon between the spun leaves.

References

Moths described in 1842
Athrips
Moths of Asia
Moths of Europe